Dr. Carliss Y. Baldwin is an American economist and the William L. White Professor of Business Administration at Harvard Business School. Her book on modularity in complex technological systems, Design Rules, published in 2000 and co-written with Kim B. Clark, has been called "a landmark book" that has impacted research on organization theory, competitive strategy, and innovation.

Early life, family and education

Dr. Baldwin earned a Bachelor of Science degree in economics from Massachusetts Institute of Technology. She subsequently earned Master of Business Administration and Doctor of Business Administration degrees from Harvard Business School. She studied financial economics under the supervision of Robert C. Merton, Franco Modigliani, and John Lintner.

Career
She became an assistant professor at MIT in 1977, and she moved to Harvard Business School faculty in 1981. She is one of the four highest paid employees of Harvard University and received tenure buyout from the Harvard Business School's voluntary retirement incentive plan.

Carliss Baldwin is the Co-founder and Advisor for Silverthread, Inc, along with Chief Executive Officer and Co-founder Dr. Daniel Sturtevant. Based on 15 years of applied research at MIT and Harvard Business School, Silverthread's CodeMRI Suite of tools and services help software organizations turn large, legacy, and monolithic software systems into cleaner modular systems that are agile, easy to understand, enhance, build, test, and deploy. 

She is a management scholar, and she studies innovation.

Honors and awards
Baldwin and Kim B. Clark won the Newcomen-Harvard Award for Best Paper Published in the Business History Review in 1994 for "Capital Budgeting Systems and Capabilities Investments in U.S. Companies after World War II".  With Christoph Hienerth and Eric von Hippel, she won the 2007 University of Vienna Best Paper Award for "How User Innovations Become Commercial Products: A Theoretical Investigation and a Case Study".

She received the 2008 Distinguished Speaker Award from the Technology Management Section of INFORMS. Her 2008 paper in the journal Industrial and Corporate Change was selected as one of the Best Twenty Articles from First Twenty Years of Publication (1992–2011).

In 2015 Baldwin was recognized as the Distinguished Scholar of the Technology and Innovation Management (TIM) division of the Academy of Management. In 2014, Baldwin was awarded an honorary doctorate by Technische Universität München (TUM) School of Management.

With Bo Becker and Vincent Dessain, Baldwin won the 2015 Case Centre Award in the Finance, Accounting and Control category for “Roche’s Acquisition of Genentech” (HBS Case 210–040).

Key works

References

External links

Year of birth missing (living people)
Living people
Harvard Business School faculty
American women economists
MIT School of Humanities, Arts, and Social Sciences alumni
Harvard Business School alumni
21st-century American women